Bahnzeit (German, literally "railway time") may refer to:

 Bahnzeit, the German television programme produced by Mitteldeutscher Rundfunk on the subject of railways
 Bahnzeit, the former name (to May 2006) of DB Welt, the internal magazine for employees of the German national railway company, Deutsche Bahn
 Eisenbahnzeit, German for the time to be used for railway operations i.e. railway time